Interstate 74 (I-74) is a partially completed part of the Interstate Highway System that will eventually run from Davenport, Iowa, to Myrtle Beach, South Carolina. In the US state of North Carolina, I-74 currently exists in three distinct segments; from I-77 at the Virginia state line to US Highway 52 (US 52) near Mount Airy, from I-40 in Winston-Salem to US 220 near Ellerbe, and from US 74 and US 74 Business (US 74 Bus.) near Maxton to US 74/North Carolina Highway 41 (NC 41) near Lumberton. I-74 has an extensive concurrency with I-73 from Randleman to Ellerbe in the Piedmont. When completed, I-74 will link the cities of Mount Airy, Winston-Salem, High Point, Rockingham, Laurinburg, and Lumberton. 

The 1991 Intermodal Surface Transportation Efficiency Act (ISTEA) authorized a new high priority transportation corridor from Michigan to Myrtle Beach, originally to be I-73. Conflicts over the routing of I-73 led to a compromise in 1995 that created a proposed extension of I-74 from Cincinnati, Ohio, to Myrtle Beach. The first section of I-74 was completed on August 27, 1996, between Steeds and Ulah. I-74 replaced North Carolina Highway 752 (NC 752) in 1998 near Mount Airy, and the entirety of the Mount Airy segment was completed by 2000. A segment of the Interstate was opened in 2008 between Maxton and Lumberton, creating the third segment of I-74 in North Carolina. In 2012, I-74 was extended from Ellerbe to Winston-Salem along US 311. The Piedmont segment was extended south in June 2013 and June 2018 in concurrency with I-73 and US 220 to Randleman.

Route description

Mount Airy

The first section of I-74 begins at the Virginia state line (overlapped with I-77 for approximately ). After separation, it goes east and connects to US 52 near Mount Airy, where the first section ends.

I-74 is to be routed along US 52 from Mount Airy to Bethania, where it will then separate onto the new Winston-Salem Northern Beltway and go east around Winston-Salem before connecting to existing I-74 south of Kernersville. Under a new accelerated construction plan for the Beltway, right-of-way acquisition began in 2012 and construction started in December 2014. Until construction is completed, travelers wanting to connect between the first and second section of I-74 should stay on US 52 through downtown Winston-Salem and then take I-40 east to I-74 east toward High Point.

Piedmont Triad

The second section of I-74 extends from the intersection with I-40 in southeastern Winston-Salem to High Point. Until January 2019, this section of I-74 was concurrent with US 311. This section was designated despite not having  shoulders, with the promise that shoulders would be widened later. Signs were installed by August 2014. This section connects directly to another section, called the High Point East Belt. It connects High Point with both I-85 Bus. and I-85. Construction completed on June 7, 2013, extended the freeway an additional  to US 220/I-73 at milemarker 86 in Randleman. The highway was originally to be completed by October 2012.

I-74 joins with I-73/US 220 south in Randleman going south to Asheboro. The freeway is already completed but was not allowed to be signed as a full Interstate until the segment through Asheboro was upgraded to Interstate Highway standards in December 2013. The fourth section of I-74 (and I-73) starts along a bypass of Asheboro where a project to improve US 220 to Interstate standards was completed, and Interstate signs went up in 2012.

I-74 continues concurrently with I-73 and US 220 between I-73 milemarkers 68 and 42, the first section marked as I-74 (and I-73) in North Carolina in 1997. It continues south, bypassing the towns of Seagrove, Biscoe, and Candor. Visitor centers (completed in 2010) are located eastbound and westbound at milemarker 61. After exit 41, US 220 leaves the freeway and the route continues as I-73/I-74 for another  toward Rockingham. Though this part of I-73/I-74 was completed in 2008 and is up to Interstate standards, it was initially signed as a future Interstate route because it had not been accepted into the Interstate Highway System by the Federal Highway Administration (FHWA) by the time it was opened, necessitating the posting of future shields. This situation was remedied on July 7, 2011, when the FHWA approved the addition of this segment to the Interstate Highway System. The route was finally signed as I-73 and I-74 in late 2013. 

A bypass under construction will extend this stretch to the US 74 bypass south of Rockingham.

Sandhills
The Western Rockingham Bypass, from the US 74/US 74 Bus. interchange to US 220, near Ellerbe, has all right-of-way purchases completed along the proposed route. Construction on a  section, along US 220 (south of Ellerbe), began in March 2014; with a contracted amount of $49.8 million (equivalent to $ in ), it was completed in April 2018. The remaining sections of the new bypass were scheduled to start construction by late 2017; however, under reprioritization of construction projects announced in 2014, they were first removed from the list of projects to be started through 2024 then had funding restored with a construction date of 2022 in mid-2016. In January 2017, however, the project, though still funded, was delayed four years due to a low score in prioritizing projects for the 2018–2027 NCDOT State Transportation Improvement Program. On January 9, 2019, it was announced that the North Carolina State Transportation Improvement Program for 2020 to 2029 included connecting I-73 with US 74 six years sooner than planned. , the completion date was 2024. 

Future I-73 ends near the NC 38 exit where it is planned to be routed south into South Carolina. Future I-74 continues to the end of the freeway. Between Hamlet and Laurinburg is an at-grade expressway that will eventually be upgraded to Interstate standards. At Laurinburg, I-74 is to use the Laurinburg Bypass that was at the standard North Carolina freeway grade and signed as I-74 in 2008; however, the North Carolina Department of Transportation (NCDOT) had to remove the signage the following year when the FHWA ruled against using them until the freeway was up to Interstate standards.

The third section of I-74 is officially named the American Indian Highway; completed in 2008, this  section stretches from Maxton to south of Lumberton, connecting with I-95/US 301. After NC 41, I-74 ends for the final time as the highway continues on as an at-grade expressway signed as US 74/Future I-74 Corridor.

East of I-95

Future I-74 is to continue to follow US 74, going through the city of Whiteville and bypassing the town of Lake Waccamaw. While there are no funded projects to upgrade the entire highway to Interstate standards, NCDOT is funding several smaller projects to replace intersections with interchanges for several of the remaining cross streets, including for NC 72/NC 130 north of Boardman and replacing other intersections with grade separations, such as with Old US 74 near Evergreen. Before the town of Bolton, it will separate from US 74 onto a proposed new freeway toward Shallotte, then go west on the proposed extension of South Carolina Highway 31 (SC 31; Carolina Bays Parkway) into South Carolina. This entire section of I-74 is still under a feasibility study with several possible routing options; it thus may take years before reaching South Carolina. Current NCDOT plans suggest that construction may not begin until after 2020 and that this will likely be the last section of I-74 to be completed.

An interchange at Boardman Road began construction on May 25, 2021, and is scheduled for completion in 2024. Two intersections at NC 72 and at NC 130 are planned to be converted into a single interchange and that project is scheduled to begin February 2023. A third and fourth project, now combined, will build an interchange at Chauncey Town Road (SR 1735) and an overpass at Old Lake Road (SR 1740). Those projects were contracted on June 21, 2022, for an estimated cost of $44 million. This would almost build a completed freeway to the NC 211 interchange in Bolton with one exception: the at-grade intersection at US 74/Creek Road (SR 2225) will be converted to a overpass in 2025 according to the NCDOT 2020–2029 STIP.

Alternate names
Though the highway is commonly known as I-74 throughout the state, the highway does have other known names it uses locally in areas.
 American Indian Highway—official name of the  section of I-74 in Robeson County (milemarkers 191–213). It is named to honor the large American Indian population in Robeson County.
 Blue Star Memorial Highway—unofficial North Carolina honorary name of I-74 in Randolph County (dedicated on June 7, 2013).
 High Point East Belt—road name in Guilford County.

History
ISTEA initially authorized the new high priority transportation corridor 5, tentatively known as I-73, to travel from Michigan to South Carolina. Because of several disputes to the routing, a compromise was reached in 1995, by Senator John Warner and Senator Lauch Faircloth, that extended I-74 from its then current eastern terminus of Cincinnati to overlap I-73. (Original plans called for I-73 to run through Winston-Salem and Mount Airy, but, when its alignment was shifted to serve Greensboro, North Carolina, instead, this compromise resulted in I-74 using the Winston-Salem to Mount Airy route.) In Virginia, I-74 would follow I-77 into North Carolina, while I-73 would go east to Roanoke then south along US 220 toward Greensboro. However, when I-73 crossed a border between two states, the federal law authorizing the road required that the two states agree that their sections meet. Originally, both Carolinas selected a route running south from Rockingham. North Carolina had more money to spend on roads, though, and, on May 10, 1995, the US Senate Committee on Environment and Public Works approved North Carolina's plan for I-73 to run eastward to the coast and enter South Carolina at North Myrtle Beach, South Carolina. Another compromise, between Faircloth and Senator Strom Thurmond, agreed to have both Interstates enter South Carolina: I-73 south of Rockingham and I-74 south of Wilmington, North Carolina. After later amendments and the 1998 Transportation Equity Act for the 21st Century (TEA-21), on July 25, 1998, the American Association of State Highway and Transportation Officials (AASHTO) accepted I-73/I-74 into the Interstate Highway System within the states of South Carolina, North Carolina, and Virginia.

The  portion from south of Steeds north to south of Ulah was completed August 27, 1996, and was the first road marked as I-74 (and I-73). Future signage was also installed north to the Greensboro area. In 1998, NC 752, a freeway spur of I-77 was renumbered as the segment of completed I-74, from I-77 to US 601. On June 30, 1999, the freeway was extended an additional  to US 52, south of Mount Airy. In April 2001, I-74 was overlapped with I-77 from the Virginia state line to exit 101.

In January 2008, a  section of freeway was completed from Candor to Ellerbe; however, it was signed Future I-73/I-74. On November 22, 2010, a  section (known as the East Belt) was added between North Main Street in High Point to Cedar Square Road near Glenola. This also includes the  section of new freeway that opened between I-85 Business Cedar Square Road. On October 4, 2012, I-74 was extended west from High Point to I-40, in Winston-Salem.

Continuing in concurrency with I-73/US 220, it now connects two segments of the Interstate from Winston-Salem to Candor.

American Indian Highway and Laurinburg Bypass
On September 26, 2008, a  section of I-74/US 74 was opened between Maxton to NC 41 near Lumberton, known as the American Indian Highway. The Laurinburg Bypass was also resigned I-74/US 74 at the same time. By the middle of the following year, the Laurinburg Bypass was removed of its I-74 designation by NCDOT after a ruling from the FHWA (it was resigned as a Future I-74 Corridor). The reason was that the section, though a freeway by North Carolina standards, it was not up to Interstate standards. It was also at this same time that NCDOT fixed an exit number error along milemarkers 181 to 191.

North Carolina Highway 752

North Carolina Highway 752 (NC 752) was the designation of the four-lane limited-access highway that traversed from I-77 to NC 89, near Pine Ridge. Established in 1994, it was a  freeway spur. In 1998, the freeway was extended to US 601 and was renumbered as I-74. Its short four-year existence was simply to be a placeholder for I-74.

Future

From Mount Airy to Rural Hall, US 52 is planned to be upgraded to Interstate standards. However, it is currently flagged "Scheduled for Reprioritization", with no estimated cost or date established.

The section from Rockingham–Hamlet Bypass to Laurinburg Bypass is planned to be upgraded to Interstate standards. However, it is currently flagged "Scheduled for Reprioritization", with no estimated cost or date established. When this section opened, it was signed "Future I-74", but those signs were taken down in late 2016.

A proposed new freeway in Columbus and Brunswick counties would traverse from Whiteville to SC 31 in South Carolina. However, it is currently flagged "Scheduled for Reprioritization", with no estimated cost or date established.

Winston-Salem Northern Beltway

The Winston-Salem Northern Beltway is an under construction freeway loop around the North Carolina city of Winston-Salem. The western section has been designated as NC 452, which will later become I-274 when completed, and the eastern section of the beltway is designated as NC 74, which will later become part of I-74 when completed.

On September 7, 2011, North Carolina Governor Bev Perdue announced that construction of a part of the eastern leg of the beltway would begin in 2014. The section to be built connects US 158 to I-40 Bus. (now US 421/Salem Parkway). Right-of-way acquisition began in 2012 and cost $34 million (equivalent to $ in ); construction was estimated to cost $156 million (equivalent to $ in ). Construction on the segment, Project U-2579B, commenced in December 2014, with an anticipated completion date of November 2018. However, after delays, including an opening date of late 2019, it was finally opened to traffic on September 5, 2020.

Since then, funding has been allocated to complete the remaining sections of NC 74 between US 52 and the current I-74 (formerly cosigned with US 311), starting with the segment between US 311 and US 158, known as Project U-2579C, in October 2017. Construction on this segment began in 2018; this section has since opened to traffic effective December 23, 2020. 

That same year, a contract for the segment between NC 66 and US 311, Projects U-2579D, U-2579E, and U-2579F, was awarded. Actual construction began April 2019 and opened to traffic on November 7, 2022. Next, construction on the segments between I-74 and US 421/Salem Parkway, Projects U-2579AA and U-2579AB, are scheduled to begin in 2020 and will open in 2024. Construction on the interchange with US 52, which began in 2019, is scheduled to be completed in mid-2023.

Rockingham bypass
A western bypass of Rockingham is planned, beginning at the partially-built trumpet interchange with US 220 where I-73 and I-74 currently end and running southwest to the trumpet interchange between US 74 and US 74 Bus., which will be reconfigured to accommodate the new bypass. Construction was initially scheduled for 2026 but was rescheduled for late 2019 and is planned to last three years, costing $146.1 million. Upon completion of the bypass, I-74 will be designated along its length and along US 74 around Rockingham and Hamlet, terminating east of Hamlet at US 74 Bus. The bypass will also carry I-73, which will terminate at the interchange with US 74 west of Rockingham until the section of I-73 extending into South Carolina is completed.

Exit list

See also

References

External links

74
 North Carolina
Transportation in Winston-Salem, North Carolina
Transportation in Surry County, North Carolina
Transportation in Stokes County, North Carolina
Transportation in Forsyth County, North Carolina
Transportation in Guilford County, North Carolina
Transportation in Randolph County, North Carolina
Transportation in Montgomery County, North Carolina
Transportation in Richmond County, North Carolina
Transportation in Scotland County, North Carolina
Transportation in Robeson County, North Carolina
Transportation in Columbus County, North Carolina